The Passengers were a 1970s Brussels post-punk/new wave band that later became better known as The Names. The original lineup included Michel Sordinia (bass, vocals), Isabelle Hanrez (vocals), Marc Deprez (guitar), Robert Franckson (guitar) and Christophe Den Tandt (drums).

Formation
The band formed in late 1977 and played their first gig in February 1978, performing a pop-oriented brand of post-punk. Musical influences at the time included the Velvet Underground, Richard Hell, Blondie and Television.

In March 1978, they won a punk contest and turned down the first prize. They were slated to record a single ("Danger Zone"/"Hole in Your Mind") with local punk/new wave label Romantik Records, but the effort never materialized.

Lineup and name change
In mid-1978, Hanrez and Franckson left the band. By late 1978, The Passengers, now influenced by Magazine and XTC, shifted to a new lineup including Den Tandt on keyboards. By mid-1979, the band changed names to become The Names.

Members
 Michel Sordinia (bass, vocals)
 Isabelle Hanrez (vocals)
 Marc Deprez (guitar)
 Robert Franckson (guitar)
 Christophe Den Tandt (drums, keyboards)

External links
 The Names website

Belgian rock music groups
Belgian post-punk music groups
Musical groups established in 1977
Musical groups disestablished in 1979
1977 establishments in Belgium
1979 disestablishments in Belgium